Advent is a season in the Christian calendar preceding Christmas. It is synonymous with the secularized Christmas season.

Advent may also refer to:

Religion
 Second Coming, the return of Jesus to Earth in Christian belief
 Nativity Fast, Advent in the Eastern Orthodox Church
 The Advent (magazine), a magazine published by the Sri Aurobindo Ashram

Places
 Advent, Cornwall, United Kingdom, a civil parish
 Advent, West Virginia, United States, an unincorporated community

Technology
 Advent Computers, a computer brand produced by British company DSG International
 Advent Corporation, a company founded by Henry Kloss that made speakers and home audio equipment
 Advent Software, a financial software company based in San Francisco
 Adaptive Versatile Engine Technology, or ADVENT, an aircraft engine development program run by the US Air Force
 Advent (Voxx International), a brand of speakers, hi-fi equipment and computer peripherals

Computer games
 Colossal Cave Adventure or ADVENT, a 1970s computer game 
 Mega Man ZX Advent, a 2007 video game
 Advent Rising, a 2005 video game
 A faction in the game Sins of a Solar Empire
 ADVENT, the faction opposing the player in XCOM 2

Companies 
 Advent International, a global buyout firm
 Advent (publisher), a publisher of science fiction books

Music
 The Advent, a British electronic music band
 Advent (band), an American hardcore punk band
 "Advent", a song by Opeth from the album Morningrise

Other uses
 Advent (film), a 2016 film by Roberto F. Canuto and Xu Xiaoxi
 Advent Trilogy, a series of fantasy novels by James Treadwell

See also
 Adventism, a branch of Protestant Christianity
 Final Fantasy VII Advent Children, a Japanese animated film

People
 Advent Bangun, Indonesian actor and martial arts artist